This is a list of TV series based on French-language comics, that is series and that are adaptations of Francophone comics.

TV series

Based on 50 Nuances de Grecs:
 50 Nuances de Grecs (2018)
Based on Achille Talon:
 Walter Melon (1998)
Based on Agrippine:
 Agrippine (2001)
Based on Alix:
  (1999)
Based on Anatole Latuile:
 Anatole Latuile (2018)
Based on Ariol:
 Ariol (2009)
Based on Arzach:
  (2003)
Based on Asterix
Asterix (TBA)
Dogmatix and the Indomitables (2021)
Based on :
 Orson and Olivia (1993)
Based on Billy the Cat:
 Billy the Cat (1996)
Based on :
  (2010)
Based on Blake and Mortimer:
 Blake and Mortimer (1997)
Based on Les Blondes:
  (2007)
Based on Bob Morane:
 Bob Morane (1965)
 Bob Morane (1998)
Based on Boule et Bill:
  (1975) 
 Boule et Bill (2000)
 Boule et Bill (2004) 
  (2015)
Based on :
  (2018)
Based on :
 Captain Biceps (2010)
Based on Carland Cross:
 Carland Cross (1996)
Based on Cédric:
  (2001)
Based on Chlorophylle:
 The Adventures of Grady Greenspace (1992)
Based on :
 Les Chronokids (2014)
Based on Corentin:
 Journey to the Heart of the World (1993)
Based on Cubitus:
 Wowser (1989)
Based on De Gaulle à la plage:
 De Gaulle à la plage (2020)
Based on :
  (2011)
Based on Franky Snow:
 Franky Snow (2007)
Based on Gaston:
  (2009)
Based on :
 Gideon (1976)
Based on :
  (2003)
Based on :
  (2006)
Based on Grenadine et Mentalo:
  (2011)
Based on Iznogoud:
 Iznogoud (1995)
Based on Jack Palmer:
  (2001)
Based on Jeremiah:
 Jeremiah (2002-2004)
Based on Kaput and Zösky:
 Kaput and Zösky (2002)
Based on Kid Paddle:
 Kid Paddle (2003)
Based on Lanfeust Quest:
 Lanfeust Quest (2013)
Based on Largo Winch:
 Largo Winch (2001)
Based on Lastman:
  (2016)
Based on The Legendaries:
 The Legendaries (2017)
Based on Léonard:
  ( Contraptus, 2009)
Based on :
  (2004)
Based on Lou!:
 Lou! (2009)
Based on Lucky Luke and Rantanplan:
 Lucky Luke (1983–1984)
 Lucky Luke (1991)
 Lucky Luke (1992)
 The New Adventures of Lucky Luke (2001–2003)
  (2006) 
 Les Dalton (2010–2015)
Based on :
  (1996)
Based on Mandarine and Cow:
  ( Tangerine & Cow, 2007)
Based on Marsupilami (from Spirou et Fantasio):
 Marsupilami (1993) 
 Marsupilami (2000)
Based on :
  (2010)
Based on comics from the magazine Métal hurlant:
 Métal Hurlant Chronicles (2012)
Based on Michel Vaillant:
 Les Aventures de Michel Vaillant (1967)
  (1990)
Based on :
 Mon ami Grompf (2011)
Based on La Mouche:
 Fly Tales (1999)
Based on :
 Nini Patalo (2010)
Based on :
  (2010)
Based on Papyrus:
  (1998)
Based on :
 Sweet Little Monsters (2012)
Based on Le Petit Spirou:
  (2012)
Based on Pif le chien:
 Spiff and Hercules (1989)
Based on Prudence Petitpas:
  (2001)
Based on Quick & Flupke:
 Quick & Flupke (1983)
Based on Rahan:
  (1987)
  (2008)
Based on :
 Rani (2011)
Based on Redbeard:
  (1997)
Based on :
  (2010)
Based on :
  (2010)
Based on :
 Sardine in Outer Space (2020)
Based on Silex and the City:
 The Darwinners (2012)
Based on :
  (2018)
Based on The Smurfs and on Johan and Peewit:
 The Smurfs (1961)
 The Smurfs (1981)
 The Smurfs (2021–present)
Based on Les Souvenirs de Mamette:
 Les Souvenirs de Mamette (2017)
Based on Spirou et Fantasio:
 (1993)
Spirou et Fantasio (2006)
Based on Tanguy et Laverdure:
 The Aeronauts (1967–69)
  (1988)
Based on Tintin:
 Hergé's Adventures of Tintin (1958–62)
 The Adventures of Tintin (1991–92)
Based on Titeuf:
  (2001)
Based on Tom-Tom and Nana:
  (1997)
  (2019)
Based on :
 Tony et Alberto (2011)
Based on Trolls of Troy:
 Trolls de Troy (2013)
Based on Le Transperceneige
Snowpiercer (2020–)
Based on Tu mourras moins bête...:
 Tu mourras moins bête... (2016)
Based on Valérian and Laureline:
 Time Jam: Valerian & Laureline (2006)
Based on XIII:
 XIII: The Conspiracy (2008)
 XIII: The Series (2011)
Based on Yakari:
 Yakari (1983) 
 Yakari (2005) 
Based on Yves Sainclair:
 (1999)
Based on :
 Zap Collège (2006)

See also
 List of television programs based on comics
 List of comic-based television episodes directed by women
 List of television series based on comic strips
 List of films based on French-language comics
 List of films based on comics
 List of films based on comic strips
 List of films based on English-language comics
 List of films based on manga

References

External links
Comics2Film
Superheroes Lives

Bandes dessinées
TV series based on French-language comics
List
French-language comics